Q-Productions, Inc. is a Latin music entertainment company owned and operated by Abraham Quintanilla.  Founded in 1990, Q-Productions is a record company and studio (Q-Zone Records and Q-Zone Studios) specializing in the Latin music industry. The company's most recognized contributing artists are Selena (who was the daughter of Abraham), Los Tres Reyes and Jennifer Peña. Q also experiments with film and video.

The company's headquarters are at 5410 Leopard Street, Corpus Christi, Texas.

Recording studios
Q-Productions has three studios, Zebra Room, Leopard Lounge and Grey Fox Room.

Selena Museum
A collection of designs and mementos of Selena are housed at the studio site. The collection includes items from Selena's wardrobe to her favorite toys from when she was young.

Artists
Selena  (1993–1995) (deceased)
Jennifer Peña (1996–2000)
La Fuerza
Los Tres Reyes
Cortez De La Sierra
Jorge Roel Y Potrillo
Sesi
La Conquista
Stephenie Lynn
Angel Castillo
Isabel Marie Sanchez

See also
 List of music museums

References

External links
Q-Productions website

Record label distributors
Mass media companies established in 1993
Music companies of the United States
Selena